Genepil (1905–1938) was the last queen consort of Mongolia, married to Bogd Khan. She was queen consort for less than a year in 1924. Genepil was executed in May 1938 as part of the Stalinist repressions in Mongolia.

Queen consort 
Genepil was born Tseyenpil in 1905 to a family in Northern Mongolia, around the Baldan Bereeven Monastery.

After the death of Queen Dondogdulam in 1923, Genepil was chosen as her successor among a group of women between the ages of 18 to 20 years old who were selected by the king's counsellors. Genepil was already married to a man named Luvsandamba.

She lived with Bogd Khan until his death on 17 April 1924, when the monarchy was abolished. Genepil returned to her family after leaving the Mongolian court. 

In 1937, the government of the Mongolian People's Republic accused Genepil of gathering materiel in order to stage an uprising with the help of Japan. She was subsequently arrested and executed in 1938.

In popular culture 

The costume design for the Star Wars character Padmé Amidala took inspiration from a 1921 image of a Mongolian lady that is commonly, though incorrectly, attributed to Genepil.

Notes

References 

1905 births
1938 deaths
Women in Mongolia
Great Purge victims from Mongolia
Executed Mongolian people
20th-century Mongolian women
Queens consort